Glencoe, also known as Coe Mansion, is located in Newark, Essex County, New Jersey, United States. The building was built in 1871 and was added to the National Register of Historic Places on October 1, 1991.

See also
National Register of Historic Places listings in Essex County, New Jersey

References

Houses on the National Register of Historic Places in New Jersey
Italianate architecture in New Jersey
Houses completed in 1871
Houses in Essex County, New Jersey
Buildings and structures in Newark, New Jersey
National Register of Historic Places in Newark, New Jersey
New Jersey Register of Historic Places